Wilkasy may refer to the following places:
Wilkasy, Giżycko County in Warmian-Masurian Voivodeship (north Poland)
Wilkasy, Gołdap County in Warmian-Masurian Voivodeship (north Poland)
Wilkasy, Olecko County in Warmian-Masurian Voivodeship (north Poland)